If It's All the Same to You is a studio album by American country music artists Bill Anderson and Jan Howard. The album was released on Decca Records in March 1970 and was produced by Owen Bradley. It was the pair's second collaborative album after several years of performing together on tour and on television. The album's title track became a major hit on the Billboard country chart, reaching the top 10. Additionally, the album itself would reach peak positions on the Billboard country albums chart.

Background and content
If It's All the Same to You was recorded in several sessions between 1965 and 1970 at both the Columbia Recording Studio and Bradley's Barn. All sessions were produced by Owen Bradley, whom Anderson and Howard had recorded with previously. The album consisted of 11 tracks. Many of these tracks were composed and previously cut by Anderson himself. This included the songs "The Untouchables", "Who Is the Biggest Fool" and "Tell It Like It Was". The album also featured cover versions of songs recorded by other artists. Its second track was a cover of Jackie DeShannon's "Put a Little Love in Your Heart" and its eighth track was a cover of Ivory Joe Hunter's "Since I Met You Baby".

The album's liner notes were written by booking agent, Hubert Long. Long noted the pair's previous work together on Anderson's syndicated television show, as well as their previous collaborative work together. Long is also praised Anderson's vocals, calling them "mellow" while calling Howard's voice "sensitive", creating a "perfect harmony".

Release and reception
If It's All the Same to You was first released in March 1970 on Decca Records in a vinyl record format, featuring 6 songs on one side and 5 songs on the flip side of the record. The album peaked at number 25 on the Billboard Top Country Albums chart in May 1970. The album's title track was the one of three singles featured in the album. It peaked at number 2 on the Billboard Hot Country Singles chart in January 1970, the duo's second top 10 hit on that chart. The single also reached number 8 on the Canadian RPM Country Tracks chart in 1970. The album also included the single "I Know You're Married (But I Love You Still)". The song was originally issued as a trial single in 1965, reaching a minor position on the Billboard country songs chart that year.

If It's All the Same to You was given 2.5 out of 5 stars on Allmusic.

Track listing

Personnel
All credits are adapted from the liner notes of If It's All the Same to You.

Musical and technical personnel
 Harold Bradley – guitar
 Owen Bradley – producer
 Bill Anderson – lead vocals
 Steve Chapman – guitar
 The Jordanaires – background vocals
 Grady Martin – guitar
 Jan Howard – lead vocals
 Roy Huskey – bass
 Len Miller – drums
 Hal Rugg – steel guitar
 Jimmy Wilson – guitar
 Jimmy Woodard – organ

Chart performance

Release history

References

1970 albums
Bill Anderson (singer) albums
Jan Howard albums
Albums produced by Owen Bradley
Decca Records albums
Vocal duet albums